Alder Creek may refer to:

Alder Creek (Los Angeles County, California)
Alder Creek (Mariposa County, California)
Alder Creek (Nevada County, California)
Alder Creek (Sacramento County, California)
Alder Creek (Siskiyou County, California)
Alder Creek (Ventura County, California)
Alder Creek (Saguache County, Colorado)
Alder Creek (Beaver Kill), a stream in Ulster County, New York
Alder Creek (Sanders County, Montana)
Alder Creek (Clatsop County, Oregon)
Alder Gulch, Montana

See also
Alder Creek Grove
Aliso Creek (disambiguation)